The Iowa Jewish News was a Jewish weekly newspaper published from Des Moines, Iowa, the United States 1932–1952. The first issue was published on April 22, 1932, the last issue was published on May 2, 1952. The Iowa Jewish News was published on Fridays. Jack Wolfe was the editor of The Iowa Jewish News. In its later period, the publication had a circulation of 1,817.

See also
List of newspapers in Iowa
List of Jewish newspapers

References

Jews and Judaism in Iowa
Weekly newspapers published in the United States
Defunct newspapers published in Iowa
Jewish newspapers published in the United States
Publications established in 1932
Publications disestablished in 1952
1932 establishments in Iowa
1952 disestablishments in Iowa